Carol Victor, Hereditary Prince of Albania (Karl Viktor Wilhelm Friedrich Ernst Günther von Wied, 19 May 19138 December 1973), was the only son of William, Prince of Albania, and briefly heir to the Principality of Albania. He held the title of Hereditary Prince of Albania. He was also styled Skënder, in homage to Skanderbeg, the national hero.

Early life

Birth and family 
Carol Victor was born on 19 May 1913 in Potsdam, Kingdom of Prussia, as Prince Charles Victor of Wied. He was the second child and only son of Prince William Frederick of Wied (1876–1945), son of William, Prince of Wied, and Princess Marie of the Netherlands, and his wife, Princess Sophie of Schönburg-Waldenburg (1885–1936), daughter of Victor, Hereditary Prince of Schönburg-Waldenburg and his wife, Princess Lucia of Sayn-Wittgenstein-Berleburg. Through his paternal grandmother he was related with the Dutch Royal Family. His great-grandparents were King William I of the Netherlands and King Frederick William III of Prussia. He had some remote Albanian ancestry through his mother, being a descendant of Ruxandra Ghica, daughter of Grigore I Ghica, Prince of Wallachia.

Hereditary Prince of Albania

On 7 March 1914, appointed by the Great Powers of Europe, his father William was created Prince of Albania. After his father became Prince, he held the title of Hereditary Prince of Albania.

With Albania in a state of civil war since July 1914, Greece occupying the south of the country, the great powers at war with one another, the regime collapsed, and so all of his family left the country on 3 September 1914 originally heading to Venice. Despite leaving Albania his father insisted that he remained head of state. In the spring of 1924, the Albanian parliament debated the form of government and Milto Tutulani, a senator, appointed Prince William, his son Carol Victor or a Briton as a monarch.

Education 
Carol Victor first attended the Wilhelmsgymnasium in Munich, after that studied law at Tübingen, Munich, Königsberg and Würzburg universities. His doctoral thesis on criminal procedure was published in Stuttgart in 1936. He was a keen swordsman and enjoyed skiing. In 1937, Swire described him as a young man of great ability, with his father's good nature.

World War II 
During the Second World War, Carol Victor served as an officer in the German army in Romania, and in the autumn of 1941 there was speculation that the Germans, who had occupied Kingdom of Serbia, including the  Kosovo with Albanian majority, would use him to rally Albanians to the German cause. This worried Mussolini's Foreign Minister, Count Ciano, to such extent that in November 1941, he accused the Germans of aiming to construct a new Albanian state led by Prince Carol Victor, which would be anti-Italian and whose militia would take oath directly to Hitler. There appeared to be little truth to Ciano's fears, and the Germans reassured him they had no such ambition for the prince. At the time of second/third Battle of Cassino he belonged to the 44th Infantry Division.

On the death of his father, on 18 April 1945 at Predeal, near Sinaia, in Romania, he succeeded as Head of the Princely House of Albania (Wied) and Sovereign Grand Master of the Order of the Black Eagle although he made no public claim to the throne of Albania. Less than a year his father's death, both his uncles William Frederick (6. Fürst zu Wied) and Victor, former German ambassador to Sweden (1933 -1943) died. Also in 1945, his uncle Günther (5. Fürst von Schönburg-Waldenburg), Sophie's brother, was expropriated without compensation and interned at Rügen island (Sächsische Biografie). His sister, Princess Marie Eleonore of Albania (Princesha e Shqipërisë) died in a communist internment camp at Miercurea Ciuc, Romania, on 29 September 1956, without issue.

Later life
In 1952, Carol Victor wrote a bibliographical survey of his ancestor the German explorer, ethnologist and naturalist Maximilian of Wied. Later he wrote "Maximilian Prinz zu Wied, sein Leben und seine Reisen" in Maximilian Prinz zu Wied, unveröffentliche Bilder und Handschriften zur Völkerkunde Brasiliens, Josef Röder and Hermann Trimborn (editors), Bonn, Ferdinand Dümmler, 1954), pages 13 – 25.

In 1960, Carol Victor left the Munich society "Freunde des Balletts", of which he was president since its foundation in 1956. The following year he published the book: "Königinnen des Balletts: Zweihundert Jahre europäisches Ballett".

Marriage
On 8 September 1966, whilst living in New York City, Carol Victor married the English-born widow Eileen de Coppet, whose first husband had been Captain André de Coppet (1892 - 1953). They had no children; de Coppet was in her forties when the marriage occurred.

Carol Victor and Eileen lived later in Cheyne Walk, Chelsea, London.

Carol Victor died seven years later without issue in Munich. He was buried at Neuwied. His widow lived on until 1985.

Ancestry

Notes and sources

Further reading
Genealogisches Handbuch des Adels, Fürstliche Häuser, Reference: 1991 2

1913 births
1973 deaths
People from Potsdam
House of Wied-Neuwied
Albanian princes
Albanian nobility
Pretenders to the Albanian throne
Heirs apparent who never acceded
German Army officers of World War II